South Norfolk District Council in Norfolk, England is elected once every four years. Since the last boundary changes in 2007, 46 councillors have been elected from 36 wards.

Political control
Since the first election to the council in 1973 political control of the council has been held by the following parties:

Leadership
The leaders of the council since 2003 have been:

Council elections
1973 South Norfolk District Council election
1976 South Norfolk District Council election
1979 South Norfolk District Council election (New ward boundaries)
1983 South Norfolk District Council election
1987 South Norfolk District Council election
1991 South Norfolk District Council election
1995 South Norfolk District Council election
1999 South Norfolk District Council election
2003 South Norfolk District Council election (New ward boundaries reduced the number of seats by 1)
2007 South Norfolk District Council election (Some new ward boundaries)
2011 South Norfolk District Council election
2015 South Norfolk District Council election
2019 South Norfolk District Council election

District result maps

By-election results

Local Elections Archive Project</ref>}}

Local Elections Archive Project</ref>}}

References

By-election results

External links
South Norfolk District Council

 
Council elections in Norfolk
District council elections in England